Almost Perfect is a 2011 drama film written and directed by Bertha Bay-Sa Pan starring Kelly Hu, Ivan Shaw, Edison Chen, Roger Rees, Christina Chang, and Tina Chen. Pan received an HBO Emerging Filmmaker Award at the 2011 Philadelphia Asian American Film Festival for the film.

Premise
A 30-something career woman named Vanessa Lee (Kelly Hu) tries to find the balance between her demanding family (Tina Chen and Roger Rees) and her perfect new boyfriend (Ivan Shaw).

Cast
 Kelly Hu as Vanessa Lee
 Ivan Shaw as Dwayne Sung
 Christina Chang as Charlene Lee
 Roger Rees as Kai Lee
 Edison Chen as Andy Lee
 Tina Chen as Sandra Lee
 Natalie Gold as Karen
 Lisa Werlinder as Susan
 Kristy Wu as Natalia
 Alice Callahan as Sales Lady
 Allison Mackie as Lori
 Chris Meyer as Frank
 Zach Page as Bobby
 Ruth Zhang as Auntie Helen
 Diane Cheng as Auntie Rosa
 Steven Hauck as Professor Williams
 Norma Chu as Grandma Tan
 Jim Chu as Tom

Reception and release
The film screened at numerous film festivals including The San Francisco International Asian American Film Festival, The Los Angeles Asian Pacific Film Festival (as Centerpiece Film), Hawaii International Film Festival (as American Immigrant Filmmaker in Profile), Friars Club Comedy Film Festival, and the San Diego Asian Film Festival (as Opening Night Film), amongst others.

Pan also received the Philadelphia Asian American Film Festival's HBO EMERGING FILMMAKER AWARD. The film had a limited U.S. theatrical release in 2012, garnering positive reviews from Variety, San Francisco Examiner, The Honolulu Pulse, etc.

Awards
HBO Emerging Filmmaker Award, 2011 Philadelphia Asian American Film Festival

References

External links

2011 films
Films about Chinese Americans
Films about Taiwanese Americans
American independent films
2010s English-language films
Asian-American drama films
2011 independent films
2010s American films